Mackay Transit is the principal bus operator in Mackay in Queensland operating services the TransLink (Queensland) scheme in regional Queensland.

Bus Services
Mackay Transit Coaches is Mackay, Queenslands biggest bus and coach operator. Mackay Transit offers many urban bus services via TransLink (Queensland).

TransLink
In November 2016, TransLink came to Mackay (in place of QConnect) and Mackay Transit Coaches still operates all Urban services in the Mackay region. The brand roll-out saw an increase to the current network. The increase added a larger span of hours, and more frequent services across the network including hourly services to both CQU Ooralea and CQU Tafe. Other improvements included the splitting of the Northern Beaches routes, with a dedicated route for Shoal Point and Bucasia, and a dedicated route for Blacks Beach. The brand roll-out was welcomed across Mackay, as a network review and improvement project hasn't occurred since 2005.
 
Public consultation took place between 4 July 2016 through to 24 July 2016. During public consultation, information such as route and timetables proposed were listed for the public to view. A survey was available to all people to have their say on the public transport network for Mackay, Sarina, Walkerston, Marian and Mirani.
 
Mackay Transit Coaches did not receive Go Card technology as part of the brand roll-out, The fares also changed due to the roll out with a 5% fare decrease. Mackay passengers are able to access the 24/7 TransLink call centre on 13 12 30 for enquiries about timetable services and to provide feedback on services. The journey planner APP will also include the Mackay network, and be available for download to bus users for free.
 
Mackay moved to the 300 series route numbering system in November 2016.

References

Bus companies of Queensland
Mackay, Queensland